Scopula xanthomelaena is a moth of the family Geometridae. It was described by David Stephen Fletcher in 1957. It is found on Rennell Island in the Solomon Islands.

References

Moths described in 1957
xanthomelaena
Moths of Oceania